Abu al-Abbas Ahmad ibn Muhammad, also Sultan Ahmad, or Ahmed el Outassi, was a Sultan of the Moroccan Wattasid dynasty. He ruled from 1526 to 1545, and again between 1547 and 1549.

Life 
In 1532, Ahmad ibn Muhammad sent a letter to Francis I of France through trader Hémon de Molon, encouraging the French king to develop trade relations. In 1533, Francis I of France sent as ambassador to Ahmad ibn Muhammad, in the person of colonel Pierre de Piton. The embassy was made up of five gentlemen and the pseudo-merchant Aymond de Molon were part of the expedition: the embassy carried watches, mirrors, combs and other "merceryes" with some falconry items; everything was to be offered to Ahmed ibn Muhammad, the King of Fez, and to his vizier and brother-in-law Moulay Ibrahim ben Ali ibn Rashid al-Alami. The embassy landed at Larache and was conducted to the king's mahalla, which was in the vicinity; the ambassador handed over the presents, which were little tasted, then he accompanied the king to Fez, staying a month there.

Following this embassy, in a letter to Francis I dated August 13, 1533, Ahmad ibn Muhammad welcomed French overtures and granted freedom of shipping and protection of French traders. His foreign policy being to counter the fast-growing powers of Spain and Portugal who keep holding fortress enclaves on Moroccan soil.

In 1545, Sultan Ahmad was taken prisoner by his southern rivals the Saadians. His successor, Ali Abu Hassun, regent for Ahmad's young son Nasir al-Qasiri, decided to pledge allegiance to the Ottomans in order to obtain their support.

France actually started to send ships to Morocco in 1555, under the rule of Henry II, son of Francis I.

He married Sayyida al Hurra.

Notes

1549 deaths
Sultans of Morocco
16th-century monarchs in Africa
Year of birth unknown
Wattasid dynasty
16th-century Berber people
Berber rulers